Gelidibacter mesophilus is a Gram-negative, aerobic and heterotrophic bacterium from the genus of Gelidibacter which has been isolated from seawater from the Mediterranean Sea.

References

Flavobacteria
Bacteria described in 2002